Wojciech Wincenty Wielądko (1744/49–1822) was a Polish historian, poet, playwright, translator, lexicographer and food writer.

Kucharz doskonały is mentioned in the portrayal of an Old Polish banquet in Pan Tadeusz, the Polish national epic, but it was apparently confused with Compendium ferculorum, another Polish cookbook.

References 

18th-century Polish–Lithuanian dramatists and playwrights
Polish food writers
19th-century Polish historians
Polish male non-fiction writers
Polish lexicographers
18th-century Polish–Lithuanian poets
Polish translators
1740s births
1822 deaths
19th-century Polish dramatists and playwrights
Polish male dramatists and playwrights
19th-century Polish poets
Polish male poets
18th-century male writers
19th-century translators
18th-century Polish historians